The 2022–23 UCLA Bruins women's basketball team represents the University of California, Los Angeles during the 2022–23 NCAA Division I women's basketball season. The Bruins are led by twelfth-year head coach Cori Close. They played their home games at Pauley Pavilion and competed as members of the Pac-12 Conference.

Previous season 
The Bruins finished the season 18–13, 8–8 in Pac-12 play to finish in seventh place. As the seventh seed in the Pac-12 women's tournament defeated their crosstown rivals USC before losing to Oregon in the quarterfinals. The Bruins were invited to the WNIT as the automatic qualifier for the Pac-12 Conference. It was the Bruins' first WNIT appearance since 2015, when they were WNIT champions. They advanced all the way to the semifinals where they lost to South Dakota State.

Offseason

Departures
Due to COVID-19 disruptions throughout NCAA sports in 2020–21, the NCAA announced that the 2020–21 season would not count against the athletic eligibility of any individual involved in an NCAA winter sport, including women's basketball. This meant that all seniors in 2020–21 had the option to return for 2021–22.

Recruiting

Recruiting class of 2023

Roster

Schedule

|-
!colspan=9 style=| Regular Season

|-
!colspan=9 style=| Pac-12 Women's Tournament

|-
!colspan=9 style=|NCAA tournament

Source:

Rankings

*The preseason and week 1 polls were the same.^Coaches did not release a week 2 poll.

Awards and honors

 February 20 –  Londynn Jones named the Pac-12 Freshman of the Week

All Pac-12 Conference honors
 Charisma Osborne (All Pac-12)
 Londynn Jones	(All Freshman Team)
 Kiki Rice	(All Freshman Team)

Pac-12 All-Tournament team
 Emily Bessoir (11 pts, 5 reb, 3 ast)
 Charisma Osborne (19 pts, 6-7 FT, 3 ast)
 Kiki Rice (13 pts, 3 reb)

Notes

References

UCLA
2022 in sports in California
2023 in sports in California
UCLA